Fritz Neuruhrer (born 17 July 1910) was an Austrian athlete. He competed in the men's high jump at the 1936 Summer Olympics.

References

External links
 

1910 births
Year of death missing
Athletes (track and field) at the 1936 Summer Olympics
Austrian male high jumpers
Olympic athletes of Austria
Place of birth missing